Joseph Anderson may refer to:

Government 
Joe Anderson (politician) (born 1958), mayor of Liverpool
Joseph Anderson (South Australian politician) (1876–1947), accountant, real estate agent and politician in South Australia
Joseph C. Anderson (1830–1891), member of the Kansas Territorial Legislature and name-sake of Anderson County, Kansas
Joseph F. Anderson (born 1949), U.S. federal judge 
Joseph H. Anderson (1800–1870), U.S. Representative from New York
Joseph H. Anderson (Wisconsin politician) (1893–1969), Wisconsin state assemblyman
Joseph Anderson (Tennessee politician) (born 1757), Tennessee senator
Joseph E. Anderson (1873−1937), member of the Illinois House of Representatives

Military 
Joseph Anderson (British Army officer) (1790–1877), British soldier, penal administrator; politician in colonial Victoria (Australia)
Joseph Anderson (U.S. Army general) (born 1959)
Joseph T. Anderson (born 1946), United States Marine Corps general

Sportsmen 
Joe Anderson (boxer) (1869–1943), 'All England' champion in 1897
Joe Anderson (Scottish footballer) (1895–?), who played for Burnley F.C.
Joe Anderson (rugby league) (1928–2014), English rugby league footballer of the 1950s and 1960s
Joe Anderson (Australian footballer) (born 1988), Australian footballer for Carlton Football Club
Joseph Anderson (American football) (born 1988), American football player for the New York Jets
Joe Anderson (footballer, born 1989), currently playing for Maidstone United F.C.
Joey Anderson (born 1998), American ice hockey forward
Joe Anderson (footballer, born 2001), English football centre-back for Sunderland

Other 
 Joe Anderson (Aboriginal activist), Aboriginal Australian rights activist who was filmed for Cinesound news in 1933 at Salt Pan Creek, New South Wales
Joe Anderson (actor) (born 1982), British actor
Joseph Anderson (antiquarian) (1832–1916), Scottish antiquarian, keeper of the National Museum of Antiquities of Scotland 1870–1913, father of the judge Lord St Vingeans
Joseph Anderson (Mormon) (1889–1992), secretary to the First Presidency of The Church of Jesus Christ of Latter-day Saints
Joseph B. Anderson (born 1943), American executive with T.A.G. Holdings, whose Viet Nam War service was portrayed in The Anderson Platoon
Joseph Gaudentius Anderson (1865–1927), American Roman Catholic bishop
Joseph Horatio Anderson, architect in Annapolis, Maryland
Joseph R. Anderson (1813–1892), American civil engineer, industrialist, and brigadier general during the American Civil War